Thomas Frank Timson  (9 February 1909 – 16 October 1960) was an Australian politician. Born in Melbourne, he was educated at Caulfield Grammar School and Wesley College before becoming the director of a Melbourne importing and exporting firm. He served in the military 1940–1945. He was awarded the MBE in the military division and, having enlisted as a Private in 1940, was discharged from the AIF in 1945 with the rank of Major. In 1949, he was elected to the Australian House of Representatives as the Liberal member for the new seat of Higinbotham. He held the seat until his death in 1960, when he died while on a parliamentary goodwill mission in South Korea.

See also
 List of Caulfield Grammar School people

Footnotes

References
 "New Members of Parliament", The Canberra Times, Monday 30 January 1950.

1909 births
1960 deaths
Liberal Party of Australia members of the Parliament of Australia
Members of the Australian House of Representatives for Higinbotham
Members of the Australian House of Representatives
Australian Members of the Order of the British Empire
People educated at Caulfield Grammar School
20th-century Australian politicians
Politicians from Melbourne